The 2010–11 Russian Cup was the nineteenth season of the Russian football knockout tournament since the dissolution of the Soviet Union. The competition started on 14 April 2010, and ended with the Final on 22 May 2011 at Shinnik Stadium in Yaroslavl, won by CSKA Moscow 2–1 over Alania Vladikavkaz. Uniquely, Alania's goal in the final was their only goal in the competition—they did not score in regulation or in extra time in any of their previous matches, winning all of those contests in penalty shootouts.

First round
This round featured 2 Second Division teams. The game was played on 14 April 2010.

Section South

Second round
In this round entered 1 winner from the first round and the 56 Second Division teams and 5 amateur teams. The matches were played from 25 April to 3 May 2010.

Section West

Section Center

Section East

Section South

Section Ural-Povolzhye

Third round
In this round entered 31 winners from the second round and the 17 Second Division teams. The matches were played from 3 to 24 May 2010.

Section West

Section Center

Section South

Section Ural-Povolzhye

Section East

Fourth round
In this round entered 24 winners from the third round. The matches were played from 5 to 15 June 2010.

Section West

Section Center

Section South

Section Ural-Povolzhye

Section East

Fifth round
In this round entered 12 winners from the fourth round teams and the 20 First Division teams. The matches were played on 1 July 2010.

|}

Round of 32
In this round entered the 16 winners from the fifth round matches and all Premier League teams. The matches were played on 13 and 14 July 2010.

Round of 16
In this round the 16 winners from the round of 32 round entered. The matches were played on 22 September 2010 and 3 March 2011.

Anzhi's home stadium in Makhachkala was ruled not fit for the game due to weather conditions.

Quarter-finals

FC Alania Vladikavkaz received a bye and was automatically qualified for semifinals as their opponents, FC Saturn Moscow Oblast, went bankrupt in the winter of 2011.

Semi-finals

Final

Played in the earlier stages, but were not on the final game squad:

PFC CSKA Moscow:  Chidi Odiah (DF), Georgi Schennikov (DF),  Mark González (MF),  Guilherme (FW).

FC Alania Vladikavkaz: Mikhail Kerzhakov (GK), Nariman Gusalov (DF),  Ivan Ivanov (DF), Boris Rotenberg (DF), Valeri Tskhovrebov (DF), Pavel Golyshev (MF), Yuri Kirillov (MF),  Gheorghe Florescu (MF), Arsen Khubulov (MF), Georgy Gabulov (FW),  Serghei Dadu (FW),  Baba Collins FW), Aleksandr Marenich (FW),  Eldar Nizamutdinov (FW), Aleksandr Tikhonovetsky (FW),  Dioh Williams (FW).

References

External links
 Official page 

Russian Cup seasons
Russian Cup
Cup
Russian Cup